Leslie Peter McLaren (17 March 1923 – 19 December 1996) was an Australian rules footballer who played with Collingwood in the Victorian Football League (VFL).

Prior to playing with Collingwood, McLaren served in the Royal Australian Navy during World War II.

References

External links 

Profile on Collingwood Forever

1923 births
1996 deaths
Australian rules footballers from Victoria (Australia)		
Collingwood Football Club players